Osh may refer to:
 Osh, a city in Kyrgyzstan
 Osh (food), another name of pilaf in Tajik and Uzbek cuisines

OSH may refer to:
 Occupational safety and health
 Old Speckled Hen, a beer produced by Greene King Brewery
 Old State House (disambiguation)
 Old Swinford Hospital, a school in Stourbridge, United Kingdom
 Open source hardware
 Orchard Supply Hardware
 Ordo Sancti Hieronymi, a religious order also known as the Hieronymites
 Oregon State Hospital
 Outside hospital, a medical abbreviation
 Wittman Regional Airport (IATA code: OSH)